Pandavleni, also known as Tirthankar Leni, Panch Pandav or Pandav Leni Jain cave, is ancient rock-cut sculptures complex located at Gomai River around 6 kilometer north of Shahada, Maharashtra. These caves were excavated by Jain saints 2,000 years ago.

Location 
The Pandavleni complex is in the bed of Gomai river carved in one solid rock. The Pandavleni is around 10 metres below the rest of terrain. There are rather identical two structures around 15 metres apart in east-west line. Sculptures in rock are carved in such a way that water in river flows over the rock, water falls in sculpture complex but force of water do not impact sculptures. It is like sculpture carved on the wall of well. During flood well will be filled with water and water will flow over well without causing any damage to sculpture on the wall of the well.

Pandavleni Complex A
This complex is nearest to centre of bed of Gomai river. There are two rooms. In first small there are five sculptures. Main sculpture room is Mahavir sculpture facing towards east, which is partially destroyed. On the right and left side of Mahavir sculpture there are two sculptures each. This room opens to second big room where there are many sculptures carved on the four walls of the room.

Pandavleni Complex B
This complex is around 15 metres in the west from Complex A in the same rock. This complex looks identical like Complex A except that in the first small room there are total seven sculptures, three sculptures each on the right and left side of Mahavir sculpture. This Mahavir sculpture is also facing east.

Present Status
Pandavleni caves is protected site under Archaeological Survey of India. As the Pandavleni site is almost 2 km away from population, it is not spoiled by any human activity.

See also

Pandavleni Caves

References

Citation

Source 
 

Indian architectural history
Caves of Maharashtra
Tourist attractions in Nandurbar district
Jain rock-cut architecture
1st-century BC Jain temples